Universe is the third studio album and ninth album overall by South Korean boy band NCT. It was released on December 14, 2021, by SM Entertainment. Similar to their previous releases NCT 2018 Empathy and NCT 2020 Resonance, NCT 2021 Universe is part of "NCT 2021" project; which saw all current NCT members from several units collaborating on a full-length release. This time, the album features 21 out of 23 members from three current units of NCT; NCT 127, NCT Dream, and WayV. Members Lucas and Winwin were unable to participate.

Background and release 
On November 13, 2021, it was announced that NCT would reunite for a third time as NCT 2021 following their second full group project, NCT 2020 Resonance, in 2020. Five teaser videos, titled "NCT 2021 YearDream" and each labeled from Stage 0 through Stage 4, were released between November 21 and November 29. NCT groups NCT 127, NCT Dream, and WayV were confirmed to participate in Universe, with WayV's Winwin and Lucas being absent from the project. NCT released track videos for "Dreaming", "Miracle", and "Earthquake", by NCT Dream, WayV, and NCT 127, respectively. The music video for "Universe (Let's Play Ball)" was released on December 10. The music video for "Beautiful" was released alongside the album itself on December 14.

Commercial performance 
Universe surpassed more than 1.7 million pre-orders on the day of release, breaking their previous record of 1.1 million pre-orders for NCT 2020 Resonance Pt.1

Accolades

Track listing

Personnel
Credits adapted from Naver and QQ Music.

 Rick Bridgesvocal director , background vocals 
 GDLOvocal director 
 Ju Chan-yang (Pollen)vocal director , background vocals 
 G-highvocal director 
 Seo Mi-rae (Butterfly)vocal director , pro tools operator 
 Ju Dae-gwanvocal director , pro tools operator 
 Nodayvocal director , background vocals 
 minGtionvocal director , piano , bass , recording , digital editing 
 Jisoo Parkvocal director , background vocals 
 Yoo Young-jinvocal director , background vocals , digital editing , engineered for mix , mixing 
 NCTvocals, background vocals
 Taeilvocals , background vocals 
 Johnnyvocals ,  background vocals 
 Taeyongvocals , background vocals 
 Yutavocals , background vocals 
 Kunvocals , background vocals 
 Doyoungvocals , background vocals 
 Tenvocals , background vocals 
 Jaehyunvocals , background vocals 
 Jungwoovocals , background vocals 
 Markvocals , background vocals , rap making 
 Xiaojunvocals , background vocals 
 Henderyvocals , background vocals 
 Renjunvocals , background vocals 
 Jenovocals , background vocals 
 Haechanvocals , background vocals 
 Jaeminvocals , background vocals 
 Yangyangvocals , background vocals 
 Shotarovocals , background vocals 
 Sungchanvocals , background vocals 
 Chenlevocals , background vocals 
 Jisungvocals , background vocals 

 Junnybackground vocals 
 Ebenezerbackground vocals 
 Kenziebackground vocals 
 Oiaislebackground vocals  
 MarcLobackground vocals 
 Dwillybackground vocals 
 Justin Starlingbackground vocals 
 Jeffrey Okyere-Twumasibackground vocals 
 Adrian McKinnonbackground vocals 
 No Min-jirecording , digital editing, engineered for mix 
 Kang Eun-jirecording , digital editing, engineered for mix
 Lee Min-gyurecording , mixing , engineered for mix 
 Jung Yu-rarecording , engineered for mix , digital editing 
 Xu Tian Hongrecording 
 On Seong-yunrecording 
 Jung Ho-jindigital editing 
 Kwon Yu-jindigital editing , recording 
 Lee Ji-hongengineered for mix , mixing 
 Jung Ui-seokmixing 
 Nam Gung-jinmixing 
 Kim Cheol-sunmixing

Locations

Recording
 SM Yellow Tail Studio
 SM SSAM Studio
 SM Big Shot Studio
 SM Starlight Studio
 doobdoob studio
 Studio21A
 sound POOL Studios
 SM BOOMINGSYSTEM

Editing
 SM Yellow Tail Studio
 SM SSAM Studio
 doobdoob Studio
 sound POOL Studios
 SM Starlight Studio
 SM BOOMINGSYSTEM

Mixing
 SM Blue Cup Studio
 SM Blue Ocean Studio
 SM SSAM Studio
 SM Concert Hall Studio
 SM Big Shot Studio
 SM LVYIN Studio
 SM Starlight Studio
 SM BOOMINGSYSTEM

Charts

Weekly charts

Monthly charts

Year-end charts

Certification and sales

References 

NCT (band) albums
SM Entertainment albums
Korean-language albums
2021 albums